Petronia may refer to:
 Petronia, the monospecific genus of the rock sparrow, named after the Italian ;
 Petronia gens, an ancient Rome family;
 Petronia City, a planned location in Ghana;
 Petronia cabinet, a 1969-1971 government in the Netherlands Antilles lead by:
 Ernesto Petronia, Curaçao-born Aruban businessman and politician
 Petronian notation and Petronian motets, in Medieval music